The 1975 Brownlow Medal was the 48th year the award was presented to the player adjudged the fairest and best player during the Victorian Football League (VFL) home and away season. Gary Dempsey of the Footscray Football Club won the medal by polling twenty votes during the 1975 VFL season.

Leading votegetters 
* The player was ineligible to win the medal due to suspension by the VFL Tribunal during the year.

References 

1975 in Australian rules football
1975